Oak Flat is in Pinal County about  east of Phoenix in the Tonto National Forest, a high desert setting at  elevation. The land is sacred to Native Americans from the San Carlos Apache Indian Reservation and many other Arizona tribes. This federally-protected area is listed on the National Register of Historic Places, and features a National Forest Service public campground. The landscape includes Apache Leap cliff, the mesa of Oak Flat, and Devil's Canyon (Apaches refer to it as Ga'an Canyon, or "Angels Canyon"), all of which have long been popular with hikers, birders, climbers, off-roaders, hunters, and members of the area's indigenous tribes. Oak Flat has been subject to attempts by the federal government to sell it to mining interests since 2002, against the wishes of the San Carlos Apache tribe.

Description
As a "blessed place" where Ga'an — guardians or messengers between the people and Usen, the creator — dwell, Apaches have lived on, worshipped on and cared for this site since before recorded history. They continue to hold important ceremonies there and gather medicinal plants. The area contains petroglyphs and historic and prehistoric sites. President Dwight D. Eisenhower protected the area from mining during an expansion of the Tonto National Forest in 1955. In an 1852 treaty, the U.S. government promised to protect Oak Flat in perpetuity. Oak Flat is a popular destination, for both campers and rock climbers.

Proposed mine

The company estimates that the mine would take approximately 10 years to construct and would have an operational life of approximately 40 years which would be followed by 5 to 10 years of reclamation activities.  In 2014, just hours before the vote on the NDAA, Senator John McCain added a land exchange deal to the bill, which President Barack Obama signed. The Act cleared the way for the land swap in which Resolution Copper would receive  of National Forest land in exchange for deeding to the federal government  of private land. An independent appraisal of the exchanged lands found that the value of lands Resolution Copper has offered for Oak Flat is about $7 million, while the Oak Flat parcel is valued at over $112 billion.

The mine would excavate an area set aside in 1955 by President Dwight D. Eisenhower during an expansion of the Tonto National Forest. The former San Carlos Apache tribal chairman Wendsler Nosie Sr. said of the Act's rider: “This is Congressional politics at its worse, a hidden agenda that destroys human rights and religious rights."

The San Carlos Apache Tribe, under the leadership of Chairman Terry Rambler, has led a strong opposition to the RC land exchange. Both the National Audubon Society in Tucson and the Grand Canyon Chapter of the Sierra Club in Arizona along with the National Congress of American Indians have joined in the fight to Resolution's land grab. Native American groups and conservationists worry about the impact to surrounding areas, including the steep cliffs at Apache Leap.  James Anaya, former United Nations special rapporteur on the rights of indigenous peoples, said that without community and tribal support, Rio Tinto should abandon its Resolution Copper mining project.  United States Secretary of the Interior Sally Jewell said she was "profoundly disappointed with the Resolution Copper provision, which has no regard for lands considered sacred by nearby Indian tribes".

By January 2015, over 104,000 had signed a petition to President Obama titled "We the People|Stop Apache Land Grab". Jodi Gillette, Special Assistant to the President for Native American Affairs, quickly gave an official White House response, vowing that the Obama Administration would work with Resolution Copper's parent company Rio Tinto to determine how to work with the tribes to preserve their sacred areas.

In March 2016, the Forest Service added Oak Flat to the National Register of Historic Places. Arizona Republican Congressman Paul Gosar, who has characterized the dispute with the San Carlos Apache as "bogus," condemned the Historic Places designation by the Obama Administration and the Forest Service as "sabotaging an important mining effort."

The project has not met all federal surface water and groundwater requirements, yet the Forest Service under the Trump administration rushed the environmental analysis despite the impacts described  according to a draft environmental impact statement released in late 2019 by the U.S. Forest Service. This report did not include adequate studies of impacts to the area nor did it consider any alternatives to the plans for the mine. The march was sixth in an annual series.

President Biden issued the Memorandum on Tribal Consultation and Strengthening Nation-to-Nation Relationships in January 2021. The final environmental impact statement was withdrawn by the United States Forest Service in March. Citing the memorandum, the Forest Service said they need more time to fully understand concerns raised by the tribes. On March 18 that year, Representative Raúl Grijalva reintroduced the Save Oak Flat Act for the fourth time, which would repeal the mandate to transfer the land transfer of Oak Flat to Resolution Copper.

References

External links
Resolution Copper Mine and Land Exchange Project Environmental Impact Statement, United States Department of Agriculture: Tonto National Forest

Geography of Pinal County, Arizona
Apache
Historic districts in Arizona
National Register of Historic Places in Pinal County, Arizona
Environmental justice in the United States
Environmental controversies
Environmental protests in the United States
Indigenous peoples and the environment
Indigenous rights in the United States
Land defender